Rajendar Singh Bhadu is an Indian politician from the Bharatiya Janata Party and was a member of the Rajasthan Legislative Assembly representing the Suratgarh Vidhan Sabha constituency of Rajasthan.

References 

Living people
Bharatiya Janata Party politicians from Rajasthan
Rajasthan MLAs 2013–2018
Year of birth missing (living people)